In the United Kingdom, the term J Band is used by the Joint Radio Company to refer to their VHF communications band at 139.5–140.5 and 148–149 MHz used by fuel and power industries.

References 

Radio spectrum